Krysztof Dariusz Bieryt (born 17 May 1974 in Nowy Sącz) is a Polish slalom canoeist who competed at the international level from 1990 to 2009.

He won a gold medal in the C1 team event at the 1999 ICF Canoe Slalom World Championships in La Seu d'Urgell. He also won two silvers and a bronze at the European Championships.

Bieryt competed in three Summer Olympics, earning his best finish of eighth in the C1 event in Beijing in 2008.

World Cup individual podiums

References

1974 births
Canoeists at the 1992 Summer Olympics
Canoeists at the 2000 Summer Olympics
Canoeists at the 2008 Summer Olympics
Living people
Olympic canoeists of Poland
Polish male canoeists
Sportspeople from Nowy Sącz
Medalists at the ICF Canoe Slalom World Championships
21st-century Polish people